Los Fugitivos (The Fugitives) is an American grupera band. They formed the band in 1985 as Grupo Kariño for brothers Jaime and Edi Espinoza. But in 1991, with the addition singer/guitarist Roberto Nieto, the band became Los Fugitivos. The band's first hits were covers, including "Esperando Por Ti," which was a Spanish-language version of Richard Marx's "Right Here Waiting." In 1993 the band scored their biggest hit with Jose Luis Perales' "La Loca," which landed them on the Billboard Hot Latin Tracks chart, climbing all the way to number 3. In 1998 they had a hit with another cover, Roberto Carlos' "Pajaro Herido," which appeared on their album Secretos. In 1999 Nieto was replaced by Hekar Rivero, and that same year the band left PolyGram and signed with Sony Discos, who issued their album "Mi Última Tentación" soon afterwards. Los Fugitivos recorded 10 albums. Winning 7 gold records and 2 platinum albums.

Discography

Como Grupo Kariño 

 1986 Este Dolor
 1987 Locuras Del Corazón
 1988 Perdoname
 1989 Tristes Momentos

Como Los Fugitivos 

 1990 Corazon Gitano
 1992 No Supiste Comprender
 1993 Vanidosa 
 1994 Te Conquistare 
 1995 Ilusiones
 1996 Dios
 1998 Secretos
 1999 Mi Ultima Tentación
 2000 Mil Fantasias
 2001 Cancionero
 2003 Un Angel a Mi Lado
 2005 Fue En Un Cafe
 2009 Nomás Contigo
 2012 Quiero Ser

Mexican cumbia musical groups
Musical groups established in the 1990s
American pop music groups
Musical groups from California